Karl Dilthey (18 March 1839, Biebrich – 4 March 1907, Göttingen) was a German classical scholar and archaeologist.

After studying at Breslau and Bonn, Dilthey — younger brother of the renowned philosopher Wilhelm Dilthey — travelled to Greece. After being privatdozent at Bonn until 1866/67, he moved to Rome and in 1869 to the University of Zurich, where he was appointed a full professor of classical philology and archaeology. In 1878 he moved to Göttingen as a full professor of classical philology, later archaeology. He became director to the archaeological-numismatic collections of the university and a full member of the Göttingen Academy of Sciences.

Published works 
 , 1863.
 , 1865.
 , 1872 – Novellas and short stories (3 volumes).
 , 1878.
 , 1879.
 , 1887.
 , 1891.
 , 1898; On Otfried Müller (1797–1840); from a lecture given at the Georg-Augusts-Universität on December 1, 1897.

Further reading 
 Dilthey, Karl. In: Deutsche Biographische Enzyklopädie, vol. 2, 

German classical scholars
Archaeologists from Hesse
Classical archaeologists
University of Breslau alumni
University of Bonn alumni
Academic staff of the University of Bonn
Academic staff of the University of Göttingen
Academic staff of the University of Zurich
1839 births
1907 deaths
People from Wiesbaden
Members of the Göttingen Academy of Sciences and Humanities